Darlene Dixon is an American veterinary scientist and toxicologic pathologist researching the pathogenesis/carcinogenesis of tumors affecting the reproductive tract of rodents and humans and assessing the role of environmental and endogenous hormonal factors in the growth of these tumors. She is a senior investigator at the National Institute of Environmental Health Sciences.

Education 
Dixon was born in New Jersey. She earned a B.S. at Tuskegee University where she completed a Doctor of Veterinary Medicine (D.V.M.) degree in 1982. Dixon earned a Ph.D. in 1985 at Michigan State University. She conducted a postdoctoral fellowship at The Rockefeller University, Laboratory Animal Research Center. Dixon received her board certification from the American College of Veterinary Pathologists (ACVP) in 1987.

Career 
Dixon joined the National Institute of Environmental Health Sciences (NIEHS) in 1987. She works as a veterinary scientist and toxicologic pathologist. As of September 2019, she is a senior investigator in the NIEHS National Toxicology Program's Molecular Pathogenesis Group.

Dixon is active in the North Carolina Women of Color Research Network (NC WoCRN). She mentors as part of the NIEHS Scholars Connect Program (NSCP), which offers a year-long apprenticeship program to students from historically black colleges and universities, as well as other area academic institutions.

Research 
Dixon’s group focuses on defining the pathogenesis/carcinogenesis of tumors affecting the reproductive tract of rodents and humans and assessing the role of environmental and endogenous hormonal factors in the growth of these tumors.

The group has used cell lines, 3D cultures, archival mouse tissue, and human clinical samples to study the influence of membrane-associated estrogen receptors and growth factors/receptors and their signaling pathways on uterine leiomyoma (fibroid) growth. Group members use leiomyoma and patient-matched myometrial samples, clinical tissues taken from cycle-staged, premenopausal women participating in the NIEHS George Washington University Fibroid Study. The rodent tissue samples are either from in-house studies or National Toxicology Program archives.

Dixon and her group seek to understand the basic molecular mechanisms of disease, which may lead to therapeutic interventions that generate alternative non-invasive treatments for clinical fibroids and other diseases affecting the female reproductive tract.

Selected works

References 

Living people
Year of birth missing (living people)
20th-century American women scientists
African-American women scientists
American pathologists
Women pathologists
American veterinarians
Women veterinary scientists
Tuskegee University alumni
Michigan State University alumni
National Institutes of Health people
21st-century American women scientists
Scientists from New Jersey
20th-century American scientists
21st-century American scientists
20th-century African-American women
20th-century African-American scientists
21st-century African-American women
21st-century African-American scientists